Joseph Churba (c. 1934 – April 18, 1996) was a United States Air Force Middle East intelligence expert, author, and political activist known for his support of Israel.  Churba was born in Brooklyn, New York City into a Jewish family that was originally from Syria.

Career
In 1965 he and a college friend, Meir Kahane, who later founded the Jewish Defense League, founded the "July Fourth Movement" to promote support for American involvement in the Vietnam War among college students.

In 1976 he publicly criticized a statement by the Chairman of the Joint Chiefs of Staff, General George S. Brown. Brown had said that Israel was a "military burden" to the United States. Churba told a newspaper reporter that Brown's statement was "dangerously irresponsible" since it gave the impression to other nations that United States support for Israel's defense had weakened. After this incident his security clearances were suspended and he left the Air Force soon after.

In 1980 he worked as a campaign advisor for presidential candidate Ronald Reagan.  After Reagan's election he served as an advisor to the United States Arms Control and Disarmament Agency.

Education
Churba graduated from Brooklyn College in 1957, and from Columbia University in 1965 with a degree in Middle East studies.

References

External links
Dr. Churba's books at Open Library.

American people of Syrian-Jewish descent
1930s births
1996 deaths
Brooklyn College alumni
Columbia University alumni
New York (state) Republicans
Jewish American writers
20th-century American Jews